Hungary competed at the 2016 Summer Olympics in Rio de Janeiro, Brazil, from 5 to 21 August 2016. Hungarian athletes have appeared in every edition of the Summer Olympic Games, except for two occasions. Hungary was not invited to the 1920 Summer Olympics in Antwerp, because of its role in the first World War, and it was also part of the Soviet boycott, when Los Angeles hosted the 1984 Summer Olympics.

Medalists

| width=78% align=left valign=top |

| width=22% align=left valign=top |

Multiple medallists
The following competitors won several medals at the 2016 Olympic Games.

Competitors
The following is the list of number of competitors participating in the Games. Note that reserves in fencing, field hockey, football, and handball are not counted as athletes:

| width=75% align=left valign=top |

| width=25% align=left valign=top |

Athletics

Hungarian athletes have so far achieved qualifying standards in the following athletics events (up to a maximum of 3 athletes in each event):

Track & road events
Men

Women

Field events

Combined events – Women's heptathlon

Badminton

Hungary has qualified one badminton player for the women's singles into the Olympic tournament. Laura Sarosi picked up one of the spare athlete berths freed by the Tripartite Commission as the next highest-ranked eligible player in the BWF World Rankings as of 5 May 2016.

Boxing

Hungary has entered two boxers to compete in each of the following weight classes into the Olympic boxing tournament. London 2012 Olympian Zoltán Harcsa had claimed his Olympic spot with a semifinal victory in the men's middleweight division at the 2016 European Qualification Tournament in Samsun, Turkey, while welterweight boxer Imre Bacskai secured an additional place on the Hungarian roster with his quarterfinal triumph at the 2016 AIBA World Qualifying Tournament in Baku, Azerbaijan.

Canoeing

Sprint
Hungarian canoeists have qualified a total of eleven boats in each of the following distances for the Games through the 2015 ICF Canoe Sprint World Championships. Meanwhile, three additional boats (men's K-1 200 m, men's K-1 1000 m, and men's K-2 1000 m) were awarded to the Hungarian squad by virtue of a top two national finish at the 2016 European Qualification Regatta in Duisburg, Germany.

A total of 15 canoeists (ten men and five women) were selected to the Hungarian roster for the Olympics, following their internal selection trials (June 10 to 12). Meanwhile, the women's K-4 500 m crew (Csipes, Fazekas, Kozák, and Szabó) rounded out the flatwater canoeing lineup at the European Championships in Moscow, Russia on June 26, 2016. Missing in the roster was Beijing 2008 kayak champion Attila Vajda and four-time medalist Zoltán Kammerer in the men's kayak four.

Men

Women

Qualification Legend: FA = Qualify to final (medal); FB = Qualify to final B (non-medal)

Cycling

Mountain biking
Hungary has qualified one mountain biker for the men's Olympic cross-country race, by picking up the spare berth from host Brazil, as the next highest-ranked eligible NOC, not yet qualified, in the UCI Olympic Ranking List of May 25, 2016.

Diving

Hungary has received an invitation from FINA to send a diver competing in the women's individual platform to the Olympics, based on her results at the 2016 FINA World Cup series.

Fencing

Hungarian fencers have qualified a full squad in the men's team épée by picking up the spare berth freed up by Africa for being the next highest ranking nation in the FIE Olympic Team Rankings.

Defending Olympic men's sabre champion Áron Szilágyi and foil fencer Aida Mohamed, who has been aiming to appear at four Olympics, secured their spots on the Hungarian team by finishing among the top 14 in the FIE Adjusted Official Rankings. Meanwhile, Tamás Decsi (men's sabre), Emese Szász (women's épée), two-time Olympian Edina Knapek (women's foil), and junior European women's sabre champion Anna Márton did the same feat as one of the two highest-ranked fencers coming from the Europe zone.

Men

Women

Gymnastics

Artistic
Hungary has entered one artistic gymnast into the Olympic competition. These Olympic berths had been awarded each to the Hungarian male and female gymnast, who both participated respectively in the apparatus and all-around events at the Olympic Test Event in Rio de Janeiro. On June 8, 2016, the Hungarian Gymnastics Federation had selected London 2012 top 8 finalist Vid Hidvégi (pommel horse), and rookie Zsófia Kovács (women's all-around) for the Olympics.

Men

Women

Judo

Hungary has qualified a total of eight judokas (five men and three women) for each of the following weight classes at the Games by virtue of their top 22 national finish for men and top 14 for women in the IJF World Ranking List of May 30, 2016.

Men

Women

Modern pentathlon

Hungarian athletes have qualified for the following spots to compete in modern pentathlon. Sarolta Kovács accepted an unused quota place in the women's event through her sixth-place finish at the 2015 World Championships, while her teammate Zsófia Földházi had claimed an Olympic spot as one of the three highest-ranked modern pentathletes, not yet qualified, at the 2016 World Championships. Bence Demeter and London 2012 bronze medalist Ádám Marosi were ranked among the top 10 modern pentathletes, not yet qualified, in the men's event based on the UIPM World Rankings as of June 1, 2016.

Rowing

Hungary has qualified two boats for each of the following rowing classes into the Olympic regatta. The men's single sculls and men's pair rowers had confirmed their Olympic boats by virtue of a top two national finish at the 2016 European & Final Qualification Regatta in Lucerne, Switzerland.

Qualification Legend: FA=Final A (medal); FB=Final B (non-medal); FC=Final C (non-medal); FD=Final D (non-medal); FE=Final E (non-medal); FF=Final F (non-medal); SA/B=Semifinals A/B; SC/D=Semifinals C/D; SE/F=Semifinals E/F; QF=Quarterfinals; R=Repechage

Sailing

Hungarian sailors have qualified one boat in each of the following classes through the 2014 ISAF Sailing World Championships, the individual fleet Worlds, and European qualifying regattas.

M = Medal race; EL = Eliminated – did not advance into the medal race

Shooting

Hungarian shooters have achieved quota places for the following events by virtue of their best finishes at the 2014 and 2015 ISSF World Championships, the 2015 ISSF World Cup series, and European Championships or Games, as long as they obtained a minimum qualifying score (MQS) by March 31, 2016. The shooting squad was announced on March 30, 2016, with the rifle specialist Péter Sidi remarkably going to his fifth Olympics, and pistol shooter Zsófia Csonka to her fourth.

Men

Women

Qualification Legend: Q = Qualify for the next round; q = Qualify for the bronze medal (shotgun)

Swimming

Hungarian swimmers have so far achieved qualifying standards in the following events (up to a maximum of 2 swimmers in each event at the Olympic Qualifying Time (OQT), and potentially 1 at the Olympic Selection Time (OST)):

A total of 35 swimmers (24 men and 11 women) were named to the Hungarian roster for the Olympics at the end of the qualifying period, the largest ever in history, with London 2012 breaststroke champion Dániel Gyurta, five-time medalist László Cseh, and multiple-time World champion Katinka Hosszú racing in the pool at their fourth straight Games.

Men

** Gyurta was tied for sixteenth place, but withdrew from the swim-off.

Women

Table tennis

Hungary has entered three athletes into the table tennis competition at the Games. Remarkably going to her third Olympics, Georgina Póta was automatically selected among the top 22 eligible players in the women's singles based on the ITTF Olympic Rankings. Meanwhile, Póta's teammate Petra Lovas and London 2012 Olympian Ádám Pattantyús granted their invitations from ITTF to compete in their respective singles events, as one of the next seven highest-ranked eligible players, not yet qualified, on the Olympic Ranking List.

Tennis

Hungary has entered two tennis player into the Olympic tournament. London 2012 Olympian Tímea Babos (world no. 39) qualified directly for the women's singles as one of the top 56 eligible players in the WTA World Rankings as of June 6, 2016. Having been directly entered to the singles, Babos also opted to play with her rookie partner Réka Luca Jani in the women's doubles.

Triathlon

Hungary has qualified a total of four triathletes for the following events at the Games. Gabon Faldum, Tamás Tóth, Margit Vanek, and London 2012 Olympian Zsófia Kovács were ranked among the top 40 eligible triathletes in the men's and women's event, respectively, based on the ITU Olympic Qualification List as of May 15, 2016.

Water polo

Summary

Men's tournament

Hungary men's water polo team qualified for the Olympics by virtue of a top four finish at the Olympic Qualification Tournament in Trieste.

Team roster

Group play

Quarterfinal

Classification semifinal (5–8)

Fifth place match

Women's tournament

Hungary women's water polo team qualified for the Olympics by attaining a top finish and securing a lone outright berth at the 2016 European Championships in Belgrade, Serbia.

Team roster

Group play

Quarterfinal

Semifinal

Bronze medal match

Weightlifting

Hungary has qualified one male weightlifter for the Rio Olympics by virtue of a top seven national finish at the 2016 European Championships.

Wrestling

Hungary has qualified a total of ten wrestlers for each the following weight classes into the Olympic competition. One of them finished among the top six to book an Olympic spot in the men's Greco-Roman 85 kg at the 2015 World Championships, while four additional licenses were awarded to Hungarian wrestlers, who progressed to the top two finals at the 2016 European Qualification Tournament. Three further wrestlers had claimed the remaining Olympic slots to round out the Hungarian roster at the initial meet of the World Qualification Tournament.

The wrestling team was named to the Olympic roster on June 24, 2016, with London 2012 silver medalist Tamás Lőrincz and Péter Bácsi competing in the ring at their third straight Games.

Men's freestyle

Men's Greco-Roman

Women's freestyle

See also
Hungary at the 2016 Summer Paralympics

References

External links

 Hungarian Olympic Committee, Rio Portal
 
 

Olympics
2016
Nations at the 2016 Summer Olympics